Graphoderus is a genus of beetle in family Dytiscidae native to the Holarctic.

Extant species
The genus Graphoderus contains the following 12 species:
 Graphoderus adamsii (Clark, 1864)
 Graphoderus austriacus (Sturm, 1834)
 Graphoderus bieneri Zimmermann, 1921
 Graphoderus bilineatus (De Geer, 1774)
 Graphoderus cinereus (Linnaeus, 1758)
 Graphoderus elatus Sharp, 1882
 Graphoderus fascicollis (Harris, 1828)
 Graphoderus liberus (Say, 1825)
 Graphoderus manitobensis Wallis, 1933
 Graphoderus occidentalis Horn, 1883
 Graphoderus perplexus Sharp, 1882
 Graphoderus zonatus (Hoppe, 1795)

Extinct species
These two extinct species are known only from fossils:
 †Graphoderus heeri Nilsson, 2001
 †Graphoderus mirabilis Riha, 1974

References

External links
Graphoderus on Fauna Europaea

Dytiscidae
Dytiscidae genera
Taxa named by Pierre François Marie Auguste Dejean
Taxonomy articles created by Polbot